Telaletes ochracea is a species of tephritid or fruit flies in the genus Telaletes of the family Tephritidae.

Distribution
Zimbabwe, South Africa, Kenya.

References

Tephritinae
Insects described in 1861
Diptera of Africa